Munson Diner is a historic diner located at Liberty in Sullivan County, New York.  It was manufactured in 1945 by the Kullman Dining Car Company of Lebanon, New Jersey. It has a riveted steel frame and exterior of stainless steel and porcelain enamel.  It has a long, rectangular form, 16 feet wide by 50 feet long. The interior has a plan typical of the diners of the 1940s and 1950s.  It was moved from West 49th Street and 11th Avenue, New York City, to Liberty in 2005.

It was added to the National Register of Historic Places in 2006. Allan Bérubé (1946–2007) initiated the saving, redevelopment, and moving of the diner.

In popular culture
The diner has served as a filming location in Kojak and American Express commercials. It served as "Reggie's Diner," the local alternative to Monk's Cafe, in several episodes of Seinfeld, such as in The Soup, when George introduces the gang to Reggie's because his attempts to date a waitress at Monk's have lead to an awkward situation. In The Bizarro Jerry episode, the 'regular gang' of Reggie's Diner befriend Elaine and introduce her to the "alternate bizarro universe" that goes on there. In The Pool Guy, George escapes to Reggie's when his fiance joins the friend group at Monk's.

See also
Empire Diner
Moondance Diner
National Register of Historic Places listings in Sullivan County, New York

References

Commercial buildings on the National Register of Historic Places in New York (state)
Diners on the National Register of Historic Places
Diners in New York (state)
Commercial buildings completed in 1945
Buildings and structures in Sullivan County, New York
Relocated buildings and structures in New York (state)
Culture of New York City
Defunct restaurants in New York City
Tourist attractions in Sullivan County, New York
National Register of Historic Places in Sullivan County, New York
1945 establishments in New York (state)